Honor Rising: Japan 2019 was a two-day professional wrestling supershow event co-produced by the Japanese New Japan Pro-Wrestling (NJPW) and the American Ring of Honor (ROH) promotions. The shows took place on February 22 and 23, 2019, at the Korakuen Hall in Tokyo, Japan and were streamed live on NJPW World.

Continuing the partnership between NJPW and ROH, these will be the fourth annual Honor Rising: Japan shows.

Storylines

Honor Rising: Japan 2019 will feature professional wrestling matches, involving different wrestlers from pre-existing scripted feuds, plots and storylines that play out on ROH's and NJPW's television programs. Wrestlers portray villains or heroes as they follow a series of events that build tension and culminate in a wrestling match or series of matches.

Results

Night 1

Night 2

See also
2019 in professional wrestling

References

Honor Rising: Japan
2019 in professional wrestling
Events in Tokyo
Professional wrestling in Tokyo
February 2019 events in Japan
2019 in Tokyo